Chrysuronia is a genus of hummingbirds in the family Trochilidae.

Taxonomy
The genus Chrysuronia was introduced in 1850 by the French naturalist Charles Lucien Bonaparte. Bonaparte did not specify a type species but this was designated as the golden-tailed sapphire in 1855 by George Robert Gray. The genus name is a portmanteau of the specific names of two synonyms of the golden-tailed sapphire: Ornismya chrysura Lesson, R, 1832 and Ornismia oenone Lesson, 1832.

This genus formerly included only a single species, the golden-tailed sapphire. A molecular phylogenetic study published in 2014 found that the genera Amazilia and Lepidopyga were polyphyletic. In the revised classification to create monophyletic genera, Chrysuronia was broadened to include species that had previous been placed in Amazilia, Hylocharis and Lepidopyga.

The genus now contains nine species:
 Shining-green hummingbird (Chrysuronia goudoti) – formerly in Lepidopyga
 Golden-tailed sapphire (Chrysuronia oenone)
 Versicolored emerald (Chrysuronia versicolor) – formerly in Amazilia
 Sapphire-throated hummingbird (Chrysuronia coeruleogularis) – formerly in Lepidopyga
 Sapphire-bellied hummingbird (Chrysuronia lilliae) – formerly in Lepidopyga
 Humboldt's sapphire (Chrysuronia humboldtii) – formerly in Hylocharis
 Blue-headed sapphire (Chrysuronia grayi) – formerly in Amazilia
 White-chested emerald (Chrysuronia brevirostris) – formerly in Amazilia
 Plain-bellied emerald (Chrysuronia leucogaster) – formerly in Amazilia

References

 
Bird genera
Taxa named by Charles Lucien Bonaparte
Taxa described in 1850